The final of the Women's Hammer Throw event at the 2001 World Championships in Edmonton, Alberta, Canada was held on Tuesday August 7, 2001. There were a total number of 34 participating athletes. The qualifying rounds were staged on Monday August 6, with the mark set at 67.00 metres.

Medalists

Schedule
All times are Mountain Standard Time (UTC-7)

Startlist

Abbreviations
All results shown are in metres

Records

Qualification

Group A

Group B

Final

See also
 2000 Women's Olympic Hammer Throw (Sydney)
 2001 Women's Summer Universiade Hammer Throw (Beijing)
 2001 Hammer Throw Year Ranking
 2002 Women's European Championships Hammer Throw (Munich)
 2004 Women's Olympic Hammer Throw (Athens)

References
 IAAF
 Results
 hammerthrow.wz

Hammer
Hammer throw at the World Athletics Championships
2001 in women's athletics